Lee Steve Jackson (born 20 April 1980) is an English former biathlete.

Career
He originally started competing in the sport whilst serving in the military.

Born in Stockton-on-Tees, Jackson joined the Royal Artillery in 1999 and currently holds the rank of bombardier in 16 Regiment RA. He competed in the 2010 Winter Olympics for Great Britain. His best finish was 55th, in the sprint. He also finished 56th in the pursuit and 66th in the individual

His best performance at the Biathlon World Championships was 19th, in the 2011 mixed relay. His best solo performance in a World Championships was 39th, in the 2015 individual race. The World Championships also count towards the Biathlon World Cup, making this his best solo World Cup result as well.

His best Biathlon World Cup finish was 16th, achieved in two men's relay events.

Despite the fact that his forenames are usually hyphenated in official results, and by the British Biathlon Union, there is actually no hyphen in Jackson's name – this anomaly came about when his coach first entered him in international competition and added the hyphen between his first and middle names.

Jackson retired after the 2014–15 season.

Biathlon results
All results are sourced from the International Biathlon Union.

Olympic Games

*The mixed relay was added as an event in 2014.

World Championships

*During Olympic seasons competitions are only held for those events not included in the Olympic program.
**Mixed relay was added as an event in 2005.

References

External links
 
 

1980 births
Biathletes at the 2010 Winter Olympics
Biathletes at the 2014 Winter Olympics
English male biathletes
Living people
Olympic biathletes of Great Britain
Sportspeople from Stockton-on-Tees
Royal Artillery soldiers
Sportspeople from Yorkshire